In Liebenberg v The Master, an important case in South African succession law, the testator signed his will (which was one page long) at the top of the page and not the bottom. The court held that the will was valid, as the Wills Act does not specify where on the page the signature must be- just that every page must be signed.

See also 
 South African succession law

References 
 Liebenberg v The Master 1992 (3) SA 57 (D).

Notes 

Law of succession in South Africa
South African case law
1992 in case law
1992 in South African law